Results and statistics for the Australian Lacrosse League season of 2006.

Game 15 
Friday, 20 October 2006, Perth, Western Australia

Goalscorers:
WA: Nathan Rainey 4-1, Adam Sear 4-1, Alex Brown 2-1, Travis Roost 2, Jason Battaglia 1, Adam Delfs 1, Jesse Stack 0-1.
SA: Ryan Gaspari 2-1, Anson Carter 2.

Game 16 
Saturday, 21 October 2006, Perth, Western Australia

Goalscorers:
WA: Alex Brown 4-1, Adam Delfs 3, Adam Sear 3, Nathan Rainey 2, Russell Brown 1-1, Jason Battaglia 1, Travis Roost 1, Jesse Stack 1, Glen Morley 0-1, James Watson-Galbraith 0-1.
SA: Anson Carter 5, Shane Gilbert 1, Brendan Twiggs 1, Nigel Wapper 1.

Game 17 
Friday, 27 October 2006, Melbourne, Victoria

Goalscorers:
Vic: Ben Newman 2-1, Robbie Stark 2, Damian Arnell 1, Clinton Lander 1, Aaron Onafretchook 1, Tristan Tomasino 1, Marty Hyde 0-1.
WA: Brad Goddard 2-1, Nathan Roost 2, Adam Sear 1, Jesse Stack 1, Russell Brown 0-1, Adam Delfs 0-1, James Watson-Galbraith 0-1.

Game 18 
Saturday, 28 October 2006, Melbourne, Victoria

Goalscorers:
Vic: Adam Townley 3, Aaron Onafretchook 2-1, Clinton Lander 2, Robert Chamberlain 1-5, Marty Hyde 1-1, Robbie Stark 1-1, Josh Naughton 1.
WA: Adam Sear 3, Russell Brown 1-1, Alex Brown 1, Adam Delfs 1, Brad Goddard 0-1.

Game 19 
Friday, 3 November 2006, Adelaide, South Australia

Goalscorers:
SA: Anson Carter 2, Nigel Wapper 2, Ryan Gaspari 1-1, Shane Gilbert 1, Philip McConnell 0-1, knocked-in 1.
Vic: Robert Chamberlain 2-1, Adam Townley 2-1, Clinton Lander 2, Robbie Stark 1-1, Marty Hyde 1, Josh Naughton 1, Ben Newman 1, Damian Arnall 0-1, Michael Rodrigues 0-1, knocked-in 1.

Game 20 
Saturday, 4 November 2006, Adelaide, South Australia

Goalscorers:
SA: Anson Carter 3, Nigel Wapper 1-1.
Vic: Robbie Stark 5-1, Josh Naughton 5, Ben Newman 2-1, Adam Townley 2, Clinton Lander 1-3, Marty Hyde 1-2, Aaron Onafretchook 1-2, Tristan Tomasino 1-1, Damian Arnall 1, Michael Rodrigues 1, Chris Welsh 1.

ALL Table 2006 
Table after completion of round-robin tournament

FINAL (Game 21) 
Saturday, 11 November 2006, Perth, Western Australia

Goalscorers:
Vic: Ben Newman 2-1, Robert Chamberlain 2, Robbie Stark 1-1, Marty Hyde 1, Adam Townley 1, Clinton Lander 0-2.
WA: Adam Sear 5, Nathan Roost 2-1, Alex Brown 1-2, Jason Battaglia 1, Russell Brown 1, Brad Goddard 1, Nathan Rainey 1, Jesse Stack 1, Ben Tippett 1.

All-Stars 
 ALL 2006 Champions: Western Australia
 ALL 2006 Most Valuable Player: Robbie Stark (Vic)
 ALL 2006 All-Stars: Alex Brown, Warren Brown, Gavin Leavy, Travis Roost, Adam Sear (WA), Marty Hyde, Keith Nyberg, Cameron Shepherd, Robbie Stark, Adam Townley (Vic), Anson Carter, Anthony Munro, Brendan Twiggs (SA). Coach: Travis Roost (WA). Referee: Don Lovett (Vic)

See also 
Australian Lacrosse League
Lacrosse in Australia

External links 
 Australian Lacrosse League
 Lacrosse Australia
 Lacrosse South Australia
 Lacrosse Victoria
 Western Australian Lacrosse Association

Australian Lacrosse League
2006 in Australian sport
2006 in lacrosse